The Navajoland Area Mission, also known as the Episcopal Church in Navajoland, is an Area Mission of the Episcopal Church in the United States of America. It is in Province 8 and its diocesan offices are located in Farmington, New Mexico.

Establishment and history
Created by General Convention in 1978, the Navajoland Area Mission comprises portions of the Navajo Reservation as well as parts of Arizona, New Mexico and Utah (see map). Formally designated an "Area Mission" of the Episcopal Church, it functions much like a diocese but with more oversight from the Office of the Presiding Bishop and the House of Bishops. Prior to its creation, the Church's ministry to the Navajo people was overseen jointly by the three Episcopal dioceses of the Rio Grande, Arizona and Utah.

The first full-time appointment to Navajoland was Frederick W. "Fred" Putnam, Suffragan Bishop of the Episcopal Diocese of Oklahoma since 1963. He commenced in January 1979 and served until his retirement in January 1983. Although 61 at the time of his appointment, he came to the Mission with a strong sense of purpose and focus on the building up of indigenous ministry.

The Presiding Bishop then appointed Wesley Frensforff, Bishop of Nevada until January 1985 and subsequently Assisting Bishop in the Episcopal Diocese of Arizona, as Assisting Bishop. Bishop Frensdorff held the position in Navajoland concurrently with his other appointments. Following Bishop Frensforff's death in a plane accident in May 1988, the Presiding Bishop appointed William "Dub" Wolfrum, Suffragan Bishop of Colorado, as interim bishop. He served until March 1990.

Steven Plummer was consecrated in March 1990. He was the first elected bishop, and the first indigenous appointee to the position. Bishop Plummer took a leave of absence from May 1993 to April 1994 following revelations of sexual misconduct in the 1980s. During his leave of absence, William Wantland, Bishop of the Diocese of Eau Claire (Wisconsin), served as Interim Bishop. Bishop Plummer, who is widely regarded as having brought stability to the Mission and having moved it along a path of self-determination, died in April 2005 following a long battle with cancer. Rustin Kimsey, retired Bishop of Eastern Oregon, was appointed Assisting Bishop and served from June 2005 to July 2006.

Mark MacDonald was appointed Assisting Bishop in July 2006. MacDonald had been appointed earlier in the year, and subsequent to accepting the position was invited to serve as National Indigenous Bishop for the Anglican Church of Canada. He served in both positions until September 2009, when he resigned as Bishop of Navajoland to focus on his work in Canada.

A special convocation of the Episcopal Church in Navajoland on October 17, 2009, elected Canon David Bailey, at that time Canon to the Ordinary and Development Officer in the Diocese of Utah, as Interim Canon to the Ordinary for the Navajoland Area Mission, pending the election by the Episcopal Church's House of Bishops of the next Bishop of Navajoland. (The unusual election process relates to Navajoland's status as an area mission.) He was subsequently elected on March 24, 2010, and ordained to the episcopate on August 7, 2010.

Bishops
 The Right Rev. Frederick Warren Putnam (1979–1982) * The Right Rev. Wesley Frensdorff (Assisting Bishop, 1983–1988) * The Right Rev. William H. Wolfrum (Interim Bishop, 1988–1990)
 The Right Rev. Steven Tsosie Plummer (1990–2005) * The Right Rev. William C. Wantland (Interim Bishop, 1993–1994) * The Right Rev. Rustin Ray Kimsey (Assisting Bishop, 2005–2007) * The Right Rev. Mark Lawrence MacDonald (Assisting Bishop, 2007–2009)
 The Right Rev. David Earle Bailey (2010–present)

References

External links
Episcopal Church in Navajoland website

Navajoland
Episcopal Church in Arizona
Episcopal Church in New Mexico
Episcopal Church in Utah
Christian organizations established in 1978
Navajo Nation
Province 8 of the Episcopal Church (United States)